The Lindisfarne Anglican Grammar School is a dual campus independent Anglican co-educational early learning, primary, and secondary day school, located in the Northern Rivers region of New South Wales, Australia.

The school offers an integrated curriculum from early learning, through Year K to Year 12. It is located in the Anglican Diocese of Grafton.

History
Lindisfarne Anglican Grammar School was established in 1981 as a result of initiatives taken by the Rector and parishioners of St Cuthbert's Church Tweed Heads The campus at Sunshine Avenue has progressively expanded its facilities and 1995 saw the growth into secondary year. In 1996 the Senior School relocated to its permanent site at Mahers Lane Terranora, with the middle school joining it in 1997. The Pre-school opened at the Junior School Campus in 1998. Development is ongoing at both campuses to house Lindisfarne's expanding enrolment.

Location
Located in Terranora in the Tweed Valley hinterland, the school overlooks the Terranora Broadwater and out to the Tasman Sea.

Education
Lindisfarne is an Anglican co-educational school serving the Tweed Coast and southern Gold Coast. It is registered and accredited by the NSW Board of Studies, leading to the award of the NSW Higher School Certificate in Year 12.

The school timetable runs using a bi-week system, with week A differing from week B on the timetable, repeating fortnightly.

All students of Lindisfarne are placed into sports houses named after Christian saints. They are:
  Saint Andrew
  Saint Barnabas
  Saint Cuthbert
  Saint Stephen

In 2009 St Cuthbert house was added to the triad, giving students the option to swap houses.

See also

List of schools in Northern Rivers and Mid North Coast
List of Anglican schools in New South Wales
Anglican Diocese of Grafton

References

External links 
 School Website

Anglican primary schools in New South Wales
Anglican secondary schools in New South Wales
Educational institutions established in 1981
Junior School Heads Association of Australia Member Schools
1981 establishments in Australia
Education in Tweed Heads, New South Wales
Grammar schools in Australia